Seven Women (Spanish: Siete Mujeres) is a 1944 Argentine drama film directed by Benito Perojo and starring Olga Casares Pearson, Carlos Lagrotta and Silvia Legrand. It was based on a play which was later turned into a 1953 Mexican film of the same title.

Plot summary

Cast
 Olga Casares Pearson as Carmen
 Tito Climent		
 César Fiaschi		
 Lucy Galián		
 Malú Gatica		
 Carlos Lagrotta as Enrique
 Silvia Legrand as Carmen
 Claudio Martino		
 Nuri Montsé		
 Perla Nelson as Perla
 Elsa O'Connor	as Doña Isabel
 Silvana Roth as Isabel
 María Santos		
 Ernesto Vilches as Miguel

References

Bibliography 
 de España, Rafael. Directory of Spanish and Portuguese film-makers and films. Greenwood Press, 1994.

External links 
 

1944 films
1944 drama films
Argentine drama films
1940s Spanish-language films
Films directed by Benito Perojo
Argentine black-and-white films
1940s Argentine films